Gymnoscelis montgomeryi is a moth in the family Geometridae. It is endemic to Japan.

References

Moths described in 1988
montgomeryi
Moths of Japan
Endemic fauna of Japan
Taxa named by Hiroshi Inoue